"Ultra Music Power" is Hey! Say! JUMP's debut single, but their second single overall. It was released from J Storm on November 14, 2007.

Overview
After V6, Arashi, and NEWS in the Johnny & Associates, Hey! Say! JUMP became the special supporters of FIVB Volleyball Men's World Cup. This single's title song "Ultra Music Power" is 2007 FIVB Women's World Cup and 2007 FIVB Men's World Cup's image song.

Limited Edition
CD
 "Ultra Music Power"
 "Star Time"

DVD
 "Ultra Music Power" (PV and Making of)

Regular First Press Edition
CD
 "Ultra Music Power"
 "Star Time"
 "Too Shy"
 "Ultra Music Power" (Original Karaoke)
 "Star Time" (Original Karaoke)
 "Too Shy" (Original Karaoke)

Regular Edition
CD
 "Ultra Music Power"
 "Star Time"
 "Ultra Music Power" (Original Karaoke)
 "Star Time" (Original Karaoke)

Chart

Certifications

References

2007 singles
Hey! Say! JUMP songs
2007 songs
J Storm singles
Oricon Weekly number-one singles